Bhura Singh Ghuman (born 1954) is an Indian academic and academic administrator who served as Vice-Chancellor of Punjabi University, Patiala since  August 14, 2017. He resigned from post of VC on November 18, 2020.

Biography
Bhura Singh Ghuman was born on 15 June 1954 at village Arkwas, (near Lehragaga) and did his early schooling at the local village school. He did his graduation from Shaheed Udham Singh Government College, Sunam and M.A. in Public administration from Punjabi University, Patiala. He completed his M.Phil. and Ph.D. from GNDU in year 1979 and 1985 respectively.

Prof. Ghuman held several notable academic positions: He served as a Professor of Public Administration at Panjab University, Chandigarh for thirty eight years. Ghuman is editor of many renowned research journals and published  73 papers  and  3  books. He was also a member of academic bodies of various universities. Besides this, he was also a member of fifth Pay Commission, Punjab from 2007 to 2009 and Punjab Governance Reforms Commission.

Awards & honors
He is an internationally renowned researcher and has recently received Paul H. Appleby award  for contribution in the field of public administration. He is also recipient of many other awards.

Stint at Punjabi University
Prof. Ghuman has taken a keen interest in overall development of university and carried out various initiatives such as improving research standards, starting the new academic programmes and specialized centres, MoU signing with foreign universities, securing increased grants from Punjab government and MHRD besides curbing wasteful expenditure. He has taken many initiatives to uplift the university in all spheres. University has been growing by leaps and bounds under his able leadership.

Prof. Ghuman has been given an extension of three years  due to his excellent work and efficient handling of university affairs by Chancellor and Governor of Punjab.

References

External links 
Official website of Punjabi University

1954 births
Living people
Academic staff of Panjab University
Punjabi University
Punjabi University alumni
Guru Nanak Dev University alumni
Heads of universities and colleges in India
People from Sangrur district